Don Moore (born 1937) is an American jazz double-bassist.

Moore was born in Philadelphia, Pennsylvania. He became interested in the bass around the age of 18. He played and recorded with Archie Shepp, Don Cherry and others in the New York Contemporary Five in Europe in 1963. Later in the 1960s Moore worked with Jackie McLean. He recorded with Elvin Jones in 1966 and Clifford Thornton in 1967.

Discography
With Elvin Jones
Midnight Walk (Atlantic, 1966)
With Jackie McLean
Jacknife (Blue Note, 1966)
With The New York Art Quartet
 Call It Art (Triple Point, 2013)
With Archie Shepp
Archie Shepp & the New York Contemporary Five (Storyville, 1963)
With Clifford Thornton
Freedom & Unity (Third World Records, 1967)
'With Rahsaan Roland KirkKirk in Copenhagen (Mercury, 1964)

References
Footnotes

General references
"Don Moore". The New Grove Dictionary of Jazz''. 2nd edition, Oxford University Press, 2002.

1937 births
Living people
American jazz double-bassists
Male double-bassists
Musicians from New York (state)
Musicians from Philadelphia
Jazz musicians from Pennsylvania
21st-century double-bassists
21st-century American male musicians
American male jazz musicians
New York Contemporary Five members